Zampese is a surname. Notable people with the surname include:

 Ernie Zampese (1936–2022), American football player and coach
 Ken Zampese (born 1967), American football coach, son of Ernie

Italian-language surnames